Sergiu Vasile Costea (born 10 January 1983) is a Romanian former football player.

External links
 
 

1983 births
Living people
Romanian footballers
Association football midfielders
Liga I players
Liga II players
FC Universitatea Cluj players
ACF Gloria Bistrița players
CSM Unirea Alba Iulia players
ACS Sticla Arieșul Turda players
Sportspeople from Cluj-Napoca